Wirral South is a constituency in Merseyside, England represented in the House of Commons of the UK Parliament by Alison McGovern of the Labour Party since 2010.

Constituency profile
Wirral South covers the central part of the Wirral peninsula including most of Heswall, Bebington and Bromborough. Wages and house prices are higher than the averages for the North West. Electoral Calculus describes the demographic as "Centrist", reflecting average views on the left-right and liberal-conservative scales.

History
In 1983, Wirral South arose for election following the national boundary review by taking over parts of two seats that were abolished to create it: Wirral and Bebington and Ellesmere Port, held by the Conservative Party since 1923 and 1979 respectively.

Political history
Barry Porter (Con) won the seat the first time when it was fought and at the next two general elections.  He had ousted the Labour party candidate from Bebington and Ellesmere Port in 1979 which he held until the election in 1983. Following the death of Porter in late 1996, a by-election was held in February 1997, the last by-election of that Parliament, held a matter of weeks before the general election was called.  It was won by Ben Chapman (Lab), who held the seat until retiring following controversy over his expenses. Labour narrowly managed to hold on in the 2010 general election, electing Alison McGovern. Since then it has consistently shifted towards Labour, she increased her majority to 4,599 in the 2015 election. She was re-elected in 2017 with a majority of 8,323, an increase of 7% over 2015, the biggest majority Labour has ever held in the seat and the biggest majority for any party in Wirral South since 1987. In 2019 she won Re-Election by a slightly narrower 14% margin.

2015 general election 
The terms of the Fixed-term Parliaments Act 2011 mandated that the election was held on 7 May 2015. Alison McGovern was the sitting Member of Parliament for the Labour Party. The Conservative Party selected John Bell. Bell had previously stood for election in Clwyd South (2010) and Delyn (2005). He had also stood twice to be a Welsh Assembly Member. He stood in a local council by-election in 2011, for Wrexham County Council.

Boundaries	

Since its creation in 1983, the constituency has consisted of the Metropolitan Borough of Wirral wards of Bebington, Bromborough, Clatterbridge, Eastham, and Heswall. The constituency is one of four covering the Metropolitan Borough of Wirral in Merseyside.

Members of Parliament

Elections

Elections in the 1980s

Elections in the 1990s

Elections in the 2000s

Elections in the 2010s

See also
 List of parliamentary constituencies in Merseyside
 1997 Wirral South by-election

Notes

References

Parliamentary constituencies in North West England
Constituencies of the Parliament of the United Kingdom established in 1983
Politics of the Metropolitan Borough of Wirral